Miftahul Hamdi (born 13 December 1995, in Banda Aceh) is an Indonesian professional footballer who plays as a winger for Liga 1 club Persik Kediri.

Club career

Bali United
Hamdi joined in the Bali United squad for 2016 Indonesia Soccer Championship A. Hamdi contracted 1 years by the club management.

In a match against PS TNI, Hamdi scored a Quat-trick, with this result, Bali United win over PS TNI, 4-2 for Bali United, Hamdi became a second player to score quat-trick in 2016 Indonesia Soccer Championship A. Previously, Sriwijaya FC striker, Alberto Goncalves did the same thing when Sriwijaya against PS TNI, then, Sriwijaya FC won 6–1 in Palembang.

Persiraja Banda Aceh
After several misunderstandings between Bali United and Persiraja regarding Miftahul Hamdi's transfer and status, it was finally confirmed that he will play for Persiraja for 2020 season. This season was suspended on 27 March 2020 due to the COVID-19 pandemic. The season was abandoned and was declared void on 20 January 2021.

Persis Solo
In 2021, Hamdi signed a contract with Indonesian Liga 2 club Persis Solo. He was transferred from 2019 Liga 1 champion, Bali United. Hamdi made his first 2021–22 Liga 2 debut on 26 September 2021, coming on as a starter in a 2–0 win against PSG Pati at the Manahan Stadium, Surakarta.

Persita Tangerang (loan) 
He was signed for Persita Tangerang to play in the Liga 1, on loan from Persis Solo. Hamdi made his league debut on 7 January 2022 in a match against Persib Bandung at the Ngurah Rai Stadium, Denpasar.

PSS Sleman
Hamdi was signed for PSS Sleman to play in Liga 1 in the 2022–23 season. He made his league debut on 19 August 2022 in a match against Persib Bandung at the Maguwoharjo Stadium, Sleman.

Persik Kediri
On 29 January 2023, Hamdi signed a contract with Liga 1 club Persik Kediri from PSS Sleman. Hamdi made his league debut for the club in a 1–2 lose against PSIS Semarang.

International career
He made his international debut for senior team on 8 June 2017, against Cambodia.

Honours

Club
Bali United
 Liga 1: 2019
Persis Solo
 Liga 2: 2021

International
Indonesia
 Aceh World Solidarity Cup runner-up: 2017

Individual
 Liga 2 Best XI: 2021

References

External links
 

1995 births
Living people
Indonesian footballers
Persiraja Banda Aceh players
Persiba Balikpapan players
Bali United F.C. players
Persis Solo players
Persita Tangerang players
PSS Sleman players
Indonesian Premier League players
Indonesian Premier Division players
Liga 1 (Indonesia) players
Liga 2 (Indonesia) players
Sportspeople from Aceh
People from Banda Aceh
Association football forwards
Association football wingers
Indonesia youth international footballers
Indonesia international footballers
21st-century Indonesian people